Magic to Win (Chinese: 開心魔法, meaning "Happy Magic") is a 2011 Hong Kong film directed by Wilson Yip. The film stars Wu Chun, Karena Ng, Raymond Wong, Wu Jing and Louis Koo. It is a sixth installment of the Happy Ghost film franchise, but a completely different version of the story.

Plot
The world consists of five elements: gold, wood, water, fire and earth. In the wizard world of "Magic to Win", the story also revolves around the "Five Element Wizardry", portraying a story that surpasses our imagination. Kang Sengui (Raymond Wong), a university professor, is the Water Magician of "Five Elements Wizardry". Although he uses magic spells in his daily life, his superpower remains a secret. By accident, his power is transmitted to his student, Macy (Karena), who recklessly uses her newfound powers for personal gain and money-making. When she encounters Ling Feng, the spirit of an amnesiac Earth Magician, slowly begins to realize there is more to magic than just profit. Meanwhile, Bi Yewu, a Fire Magician, sets out on a mission to capture the elemental magicians in order to open a rift in time in an attempt to change history and save his parents who perished in a fire in his youth. His search leads him to Ling Feng, Wood Magician Gu Xinyue, Metal Magician Charlie and finally Macy. The rift eventually opens and the world is put on the moment of doom.

Cast
Wu Chun as Ling Feng: Earth Magician. He lost his memory and powers and body after losing a battle to the Fire Magician.
 Karena Ng as Ching Mei-si/Macy Cheng: She gained Professor Kang's power by accident, and frequently uses it for personal gain.
Raymond Wong as Professor Hong Sam-gwai/Kang Sen Gui: Water Magician who teaches at Macy's college. He tries to teach Macy the best ways of using magic.
Louis Koo as Ku San-yu/Gu Xinyue: Wood Magician. He uses his ability of clairvoyance for his writing.
Wu Jing as Bi Yewu: Fire Magician and the main antagonist. He sets out to capture all the elemental magicians for his own purpose.
 Tonny Jan as Charlie: Metal Magician and a stage magician.
 Yan Ni as Lau Wah-li: Volleyball coach. She is strict and sees sports as her whole existence.

Awards and nominations
 31st Hong Kong Film Awards

References

External links

Magic to Win at Hong Kong Cinemagic

2011 films
2011 fantasy films
Films directed by Wilson Yip
Hong Kong fantasy films
Hong Kong sequel films
2010s Hong Kong films